These are the results of the men's K-1 10,000 metres competition in canoeing at the 1936 Summer Olympics. The K-1 event is raced by single-man canoe sprint kayaks and took place on Friday, August 7.

Fifteen canoeists from 15 nations competed.

Medalists

Final
Friday, August 7, 1936: Only a final was held.

References
1936 Summer Olympics Official Report Volume 2. p. 1028.
Sports reference.com 1936 K-1 10000 m results.

Men's K-1 10000